Marty Ruff (born May 19, 1963) is a Canadian former professional ice hockey defenceman. He was drafted in the first round, 20th overall, by the St. Louis Blues in the 1981 NHL Entry Draft, however, he never played in the National Hockey League. He is the younger brother of former player and coach Lindy Ruff of the NHL.

Career statistics

Regular season and playoffs

External links

1963 births
Living people
Canadian ice hockey defencemen
Canadian people of Ukrainian descent
Ice hockey people from Alberta
Lethbridge Broncos players
Montana Magic players
Muskegon Mohawks players
National Hockey League first-round draft picks
Peoria Rivermen (IHL) players
Portland Winterhawks players
St. Louis Blues draft picks
Toledo Goaldiggers players